William Benton (born 1939) is an American writer, poet, and novelist. He has published multiple volumes of poetry, including Birds, and his novel Madly was published in 2005. His nonfiction work includes the book Exchanging Hats, about the artwork of poet Elizabeth Bishop, and co-editing the book Gods of Tin: The Flying Years about James Salter.

Literary career
Benton published his first poetry collection Birds in 1972 as a limited edition, and later published further editions, including in 2002 and 2020. His poetry has also appeared in The New Yorker, The Paris Review, and other periodicals. 

Benton has also published books about art. He is the editor of the 1996 book Exchanging Hats, a curated collection of artwork by the poet Elizabeth Bishop. In a Chicago Tribune review, Penelope Mesic writes, "Until now, the world has known Bishop by her poems, so crystalline, exact, complete and unpretentious that many regard her as the premier poet of her generation." In a New York Times review, John Russell wrote, "when we close the book, we know what Meyer Schapiro meant when he said that Bishop wrote poems with a painter's eye. It was for their editor, William Benton, to coax them out of hiding, and he did a very good job."

Benton co-edited Gods of Tin: The Flying Years, which is a collection of works by James Salter and described in a review by Publishers Weekly as "a splendid thing in a small package". Benton also co-wrote the introduction to the book. His novel Madly was published in 2005. Lacy Crawford wrote in Narrative Magazine, “The novel is itself a poetic meditation on how desire attempts to shape the world. Its diction and imagery are startling.”  It was described as "An uneven love story, with poetic moments" by Kirkus Reviews. A review for Library Journal recommends the novel for large fiction collections, and states, "the elegance of Benton's poetic language is engaging, but it never quite compensates for this novel's slow pacing." He also wrote the book, music, and lyrics for the musical theater production "Out of the Blue", which was panned by The New York Times in 1999.

As of 2022, he lives in New York City.

Published works
 The Bell Poems (poetry, 1970)
 Birds (poetry, 1972)
 Eye La View (poetry, 1975)
 L'Aprè-Midi D'un Faune (poetry, int. by Guy Davenport, limited edition, 1976)
 Normal Meanings (poetry, 1978)
 Marmalade (poetry, limited edition, with original prints by James McGarrell, 1993)
 Exchanging Hats: Elizabeth Bishop Paintings (art, 1996)
 Out of the Blue (play; music, lyrics and book, New York production, 1999)
 Deaf Elephants (children's book, 2001)
 Birds (expanded edition, 2002)
 Gods of Tin (ed., 2004)
 Madly (novel, 2005)
 A Quatrain on Sleeping Beauty's Tomb (trans.,2011)
 The Mary Julia Paintings of Joan Brown (art, 2016)
 Backlit (poetry, 2017)
 Eye Contact (art, 2018)
 Birds (poetry, 3rd edition, 2020)
 Reliquaries, The Sculpture of Ted Waltz (art, 2020)
 Light on Water, New and Selected Poems, 1972-2022

In periodicals
The New Yorker, "Dinner", 1997
The New Yorker, "Camera Obscura", 1999
The Paris Review No. 155, Summer 2000, "Two Poems"
The Paris Review No. 160, Winter 2001, "Two Poems"
 
Elizabeth Bishop’s Other Art, 2011 article by Benton at The New York Review of Books
, 2023

References

External links
 Reading, The American Poetry Archive, San Francisco State University, November 20, 1974
Featured in documentary film "James Salter: A Sport and a Pastime"

1939 births
Writers from Houston
Writers from New York City
Living people
Pacific Northwest College of Art faculty
20th-century American poets
21st-century American poets
20th-century American male writers
21st-century American male writers